Lair Paulo Barata Ribeiro (born 29 December 1899, date of death unknown), known as just Barata, was a Brazilian footballer. He played in three matches for the Brazil national football team in 1921. He was also part of Brazil's squad for the 1921 South American Championship.

References

External links
 
 

1899 births
Year of death missing
Brazilian footballers
Brazil international footballers
Footballers from Rio de Janeiro (city)
Association football defenders
America Football Club (Rio de Janeiro) players